The 1954–55 Cypriot Second Division was the second season of the Cypriot second-level football league. Nea Salamis Famagusta won their 1st title.

Format
Eleven teams participated in the 1954–55 Cypriot Second Division. The league was split into three geographical groups, depending from which Districts of Cyprus each participated team came from. All teams of each group played against each other twice, once at their home and once away. The team with the most points at the end of the season were crowned group champions. The winners of each group played against each other in the final phase of the competition and the winner were the champions of the Second Division. The champion were promoted to the 1955–56 Cypriot First Division. 

Teams received two points for a win, one point for a draw and zero points for a loss.

Changes from previous season
Teams promoted to 1954–55 Cypriot First Division
 Aris Limassol

New members of CFA
 Alki Larnaca
 Orfeas Nicosia
 PAEK

Stadiums and locations

Nicosia-Keryneia Group
League standings

Results

Larnaca-Famagusta Group
League standings

Results

Limassol-Paphos Group
League standings

Results

Champions Playoffs 
League standings

Results

See also
 Cypriot Second Division
 1954–55 Cypriot First Division
 1954–55 Cypriot Cup

Sources 

Cypriot Second Division seasons
Cyprus
1954–55 in Cypriot football